KELT-10b is an exoplanet orbiting the G-type main-sequence star KELT-10 approximately 618 light-years away in the southern constellation Telescopium. It was discovered using the transit method, and was announced in 2016.

Discovery 
KELT-10b was discovered by a group of scientists at the SAAO using the KELT-South telescope. The light curves and parameters of the system were observed, and it iss predicted that due to the host's activity and evolution state along the HR Diagram, the planet is bloated. KELT-10b is part of a group of exoplanets that will be observed by the ESA mission ARIEL.

Properties 
KELT-10b has 68% the mass of Jupiter, but is about 40% larger than the Jovian planet. KELT-10b has a typical four-day orbit around its host at a separation about ten times greater than Mercury, but is unknown if it's orbiting on a circular or an elliptical one. Observations of the planet with the Very Large Telescope resulted in the discovery of the presence of sodium in the atmosphere.

See also 
 List of largest exoplanets
 List of nearest exoplanets
 List of potentially habitable exoplanets

References 

Telescopium (constellation)
Hot Jupiters
Exoplanets discovered in 2015
Exoplanets discovered by KELT